Thomas Kincaid (1661–1726) was a Scottish medical student, golfer, and archer who wrote early golf instructions.

Thomas Kincaid or Tom Kinkaid may also refer to:
 Tom Kincaid (1883–1910), American race car driver
 Tom Kincaid, a character in the 1933 film The Past of Mary Holmes
 Tommy Kincaid or Champ, a character in the 2007 film Resurrecting the Champ

See also
 Kincaid (disambiguation)
 Thomas Kinkade (1958–2012), American painter
 Thomas C. Kinkaid (1888–1972), admiral in the United States Navy during World War II